The 2015–16 Stony Brook Seawolves women's basketball team will represent Stony Brook University during the 2015–16 NCAA Division I women's basketball season. The Seawolves, led by second year head coach Caroline McCombs and play their home games at the Island Federal Credit Union Arena and are members in the America East Conference. They finished the season 17–15, 8-8 in America East play to finish in a 3-way tie for fourth place. They advanced to the semifinals of the America East women's tournament where they lost to Maine. They were invited to the Women's Basketball Invitational where they lost to Youngstown State in the first round.

Media
All non-televised home games and conference road games will stream on either ESPN3 or AmericaEast.tv. Most road games will stream on the opponents website. All games will have an audio broadcast streamed online through the Pack Network.

Roster

Schedule

|-
!colspan=9 style="background:#; color:white;"| Non-conference regular season

|-
!colspan=9 style="background:#; color:white;"| America East regular season

|-
!colspan=9 style="background:#; color:white;"| America East Women's Tournament

|-
!colspan=9 style="background:#; color:white;"| WBI

See also
2015–16 Stony Brook Seawolves men's basketball team

References

Stony Brook Seawolves women's basketball seasons
Stony Brook Seawolves women's basketball team
Stony Brook
Stony Brook Seawolves women's basketball team
Stony Brook Seawolves women's basketball team